The Old Rockport Hutterite Colony, off the James River (Dakotas) in Hanson County, South Dakota near Alexandria, was listed on the National Register of Historic Places in 1982.  The listing included nine contributing buildings.

References

National Register of Historic Places in South Dakota
Buildings and structures completed in 1914
Hanson County, South Dakota